Dinu Cristea (10 August 1911 – 1991) was a Romanian long-distance runner. He competed in the marathon at the 1952 Summer Olympics, finishing in 31st place. 

He ran for the first time in an official competition in 1933.

During his running career, Cristea earned 46 national titles (the highest number in Romanian athletics) and established 19 national records. His favorite events were the 5000 metres and the 10,000 metres, although he would also occasionally compete in the 1500 metres and the marathon. He retired at age 51.

References

External links

1911 births
1991 deaths
People from Călărași County
Romanian male long-distance runners
Romanian male marathon runners
Athletes (track and field) at the 1952 Summer Olympics
Olympic athletes of Romania